Paul Pisani (1852–1933) was a Franciscan friar and historian from France.

Family background 
Pisani's ancestors of French-Italian origin settled at the Levant at the end of the 18th century. They served French and Russian embassies in Constantinople. Pisani was therefore fluent in French and Italian and also had some knowledge of Serbo-Croatian.

Career 

Pisani was ordained a priest in 1878 and received his D.Litt. in 1893. He was a professor at the Institut Catholique de Paris from 1888 to 1889 and from 1908 to 1922. He was a close friend of Monseigneur Maurice Le Sage d'Hauteroche d'Hulst, founder of the Institut Catholique, and was his secretary from 1884 to 1888.

Selected works 
 Les journaux français dans les Provinces Illyriennes pendant l'époque impériale - Paris 1887
 La Légende de Skanderbeg - 1891
 Num Ragusini ab omni iure Veneto a sæc. x usque ad sæac. xiv immunes fuerint - 1893
 La Dalmatie de 1797 à 1815 - 1893
 Études d'histoire religieuse: A travers l'Orient - 1987
 Répertoire biographique de l'épiscopat constitutionnel (1791-1802) - 1907
 Les Missions protestantes à la fin du XIXe siècle - 1908
 L'église de Paris et la revolution - 1911
 Les compagnies de prêtres du XVIe au XVIIIe siècle - 1928

Pisani emphasized in his works that pretended racial unity of the population of the Illyrian Provinces was partially imagingary. He was a friend of Tullio Erber whose interpretation of some events was, according to Pisani, influenced by the Austrian government that was employer of Erber.

References

Further reading 
  - about other members of Pisani family and their diplomatic career in Constantinople

External links
 

1852 births
1933 deaths
19th-century French writers
19th-century French Roman Catholic priests
20th-century French writers
20th-century French Roman Catholic priests
French Franciscans
French religious writers
French male writers
20th-century male writers